The Fitchburg Yarn Mill is an historic mill building at 1428 Main Street in Fitchburg, Massachusetts.  Built in 1907 and enlarged several times, it was one of the city's largest textile operations for over 60 years.  The building is an important local work of Frank Sheldon, a noted industrial architect of the period.  The building was listed on the National Register of Historic Places in 2016.

Description and history
The former Fitchburg Yarn Mill is located on the between Main Street and the north bank of the Nashua River northwest of downtown Fitchburg. It is three stories in height and built out of red brick. Windows are set in segmented-arch openings with concrete sills, the bays articulated by simple brick pilasters. Attached to the main mill are a two-story office building, an engine house, and a round brick chimney.

The Fitchburg Yarn Company was incorporated in 1906, and this plant was built and operations begun the following year.  The building reached its present dimensions in 1919, with the construction of the easternmost section.  The building was designed by Frank Sheldon, an industrial architect based in Providence, Rhode Island; his firm provided industrial architectural services across the eastern United States, and is credited with a number of significant surviving mills.  The company's leadership were all prominent local businessmen; members of Lyman family were involved in the management of the company for most of its operational existence.  The mill was closed about 1970 and the building subsequently redeveloped for multi-family residential use.

See also
National Register of Historic Places listings in Worcester County, Massachusetts

References

Industrial buildings and structures on the National Register of Historic Places in Massachusetts
Textile mills in the United States
National Register of Historic Places in Worcester County, Massachusetts
Buildings and structures in Fitchburg, Massachusetts
Yarn